Gertrude Bambrick (August 24, 1897 – January 10, 1974) was an American actress of the silent era. She appeared in 60 films between 1912 and 1916.

Biography
Bambrick was married twice. Her first marriage to early film director Marshall Neilan ended in divorce and resulted in one child, Marshall Neilan Jr, who later became a successful film editor. Neilan fell in love with Bambrick while working in New York City in 1914, and at the time he was a rising star in film direction. At one point during their marriage he was earning $15,000 per week. He was involved in several affairs during their marriage. Bambrick retired from acting in 1916 after marrying Neilan, before her career could ever really take off.

Bambrick divorced Neilan in 1921 after discovering he was involved in an affair with early film actress Blanche Sweet. Neilan went on to marry Sweet, and they divorced in 1929, when his career failed and he was in financial ruin.

Bambrick's second marriage was to Jack Alicoate. They had two children, Patricia and Virginia. She never returned to acting and died in Boynton Beach, Florida.

Selected filmography

External links

1897 births
1974 deaths
Actresses from Florida
American film actresses
American silent film actresses
People from Boynton Beach, Florida
Place of birth unknown
20th-century American actresses